{{DISPLAYTITLE:C9H12N2O4S}}
The molecular formula C9H12N2O4S (molar mass: 244.268 g/mol, exact mass: 244.0518 u) may refer to:

 BRL-50481
 Pidotimod

Molecular formulas